Uno Lõhmus (born 30 October 1952) is an Estonian judge. From 1998 to 2004, he was the Chief Justice of the Supreme Court of Estonia.

He was born in Mõisaküla.

In 2005 he was awarded with Order of the White Star, II class.

References

Living people
1952 births
20th-century Estonian judges
People from Viljandi County
21st-century Estonian judges